Thelton Eugene Henderson (born November 28, 1933) is an inactive Senior United States district judge of the United States District Court for the Northern District of California. He has played an important role in the field of civil rights as a lawyer, educator, and jurist.

Education and career

Born on November 28, 1933, in Shreveport, Louisiana, Henderson received a Bachelor of Arts degree from the University of California, Berkeley in 1956. He received a Juris Doctor from the UC Berkeley School of Law in 1962. He was in the United States Army as a Corporal from 1956 to 1958. He was the first African-American attorney for the Civil Rights Division of the United States Department of Justice from 1962 to 1963. He was in private practice of law in Oakland, California from 1964 to 1966. He was the Directing Attorney of the East Bayshore Neighborhood Legal Center in East Palo Alto, California from 1966 to 1969. He was an assistant dean at Stanford Law School from 1968 to 1977. He was in private practice of law in San Francisco, California from 1977 to 1980. He was an associate professor at the Golden Gate University School of Law from 1978 to 1980.

Notable service

Henderson was sent to the South to monitor local law enforcement for any civil rights abuses, a role that included investigating the 1963 16th Street Baptist Church bombing, which killed four girls. In this capacity, he became acquainted with Martin Luther King Jr. and other leaders of the Civil Rights Movement after winning over their initial skepticism of a government attorney.

Federal judicial service

Henderson was nominated by President Jimmy Carter on May 9, 1980, to a seat on the United States District Court for the Northern District of California vacated by Judge Cecil F. Poole. He was confirmed by the United States Senate on June 26, 1980, and received his commission on June 30, 1980. He served as Chief Judge from 1990 to 1997. He assumed senior status on November 28, 1998. He took inactive senior status on August 11, 2017, meaning that while he remains a federal judge, he no longer hears cases or participates in the business of the court.

Notable cases

In the late 1980s, Henderson presided over a long-running case over the fishing industry's practice of snaring dolphins in its tuna nets. Environmental groups charged that millions of dolphins had drowned because of the industry's refusal to follow existing safety regulations. He rejected attempts by the Clinton and Bush administrations to relax legal standards on fishing practices and loosen dolphin safe labeling on tuna.

In 1982 Henderson overturned the conviction of Johnny Spain, the only member of The San Quentin Six convicted of murder for the deaths of three California Correctional Peace Officers and two inmates in a riot and escape attempt led by Black Panther Party member and Black Guerilla Family founder George Jackson (Black Panther). In a landmark 1995 civil rights case, Madrid v. Gomez, Henderson found the use of force and level of medical care at Pelican Bay State Prison unconstitutional. During its subsequent federal oversight process, Henderson was known to visit the prison personally.

In a 1997 decision, he struck down Proposition 209, the anti-affirmative action California initiative, as unconstitutional, but the next year a three-judge Court of Appeals panel overturned his decision.

In 2005, Henderson found that substandard medical care in the California prison system had violated prisoners' rights under the Eighth Amendment to the United States Constitution to be protected from cruel and unusual punishment and had led to unnecessary deaths in California prisons.

In 2006 he appointed Robert Sillen as receiver to take over the health care system of the California Department of Corrections and Rehabilitation; he replaced Sillen with J. Clark Kelso in 2008.

Honors and recognition

Among his awards are the American Bar Association's Thurgood Marshall Award, the State Bar of California's Bernard Witkin Medal, the Pearlstein Civil Rights Award from the Anti-Defamation League, the Distinguished Service Award by the National Bar Association, the Lewis F. Powell, Jr. Award for Professionalism and Ethics from the American Inns of Court, the Judge Learned Hand Award from the American Jewish Committee and the 2008 Alumnus of the Year Award from the California Alumni Association at the University of California, Berkeley. The Thelton E. Henderson Center for Social Justice at Boalt Hall is named for him. A documentary on his life, Soul of Justice by Abby Ginzberg, was released in late 2005.

See also 
 List of African-American federal judges
 List of African-American jurists

References

External links
 
 Marijuana Scheduling Finally Gets Day in Court
 San Francisco Chronicle article
 Soul of Justice: Thelton Henderson's American Journey
 Civil Rights Pioneer, Federal Judge, Biopic Subject, and Alumnus of the Year
 Thelton E. Henderson Center for Social Justice
 "The Honorable Thelton E. Henderson: Making a Difference, The Federal Judiciary and Civil Rights in the United States, 1933-2002." Interviews conducted by Leah McGarrigle, 2001–2002. Northern California U.S. District Court Oral History Series, Bancroft Library, University of California, Berkeley, 2005.

1933 births
Living people
African-American judges
American civil rights lawyers
California lawyers
University of California, Berkeley alumni
UC Berkeley School of Law alumni
Judges of the United States District Court for the Northern District of California
United States district court judges appointed by Jimmy Carter
20th-century American judges
United States Department of Justice lawyers
Golden Gate University faculty
United States Army non-commissioned officers
21st-century American judges